Deu Gunaji Mandrekar (born 18 March 1923, date of death unknown) was an Indian politician. He was elected to the Goa Legislative Assembly from Pernem in the 1977, 1980 as a member of the Maharashtrawadi Gomantak Party and from Dargalim in the 1989, 1994 Goa Legislative Assembly election. He was Deputy Speaker of the Goa Legislative Assembly from January 1995 to November 1998.

In 1999, Mandrekar ran as an independent, having defected ten times by that point. In April 2012, it was noted that Mandrekar is deceased.

References

1923 births
Year of death missing
Members of the Goa Legislative Assembly
Deputy Speakers of the Goa Legislative Assembly
People from South Goa district
Goa MLAs 1977–1980
Goa MLAs 1989–1994
Goa MLAs 1994–1999
Goa MLAs 1980–1984
Indian National Congress politicians
Maharashtrawadi Gomantak Party politicians
Goa Rajiv Congress Party politicians